Musa salaccensis, commonly called Javanese wild banana, is a Malesian tropical species of plant in the banana family native to the islands of Sumatra and Java, in Indonesia. It is placed in section Callimusa (now including the former section Australimusa), members of which have a diploid chromosome number of 2n = 20.

Uses
The terminal inflorescences and male flower buds are edible, and can be cooked, or used as an ingredient in salads.

References

salaccensis
Flora of Sumatra
Flora of Java
Plants described in 1867
Taxa named by Heinrich Zollinger
Taxa named by Wilhelm Sulpiz Kurz